Obrąb may refer to the following places:
Obrąb, Ciechanów County in Masovian Voivodeship (east-central Poland)
Obrąb, Przasnysz County in Masovian Voivodeship (east-central Poland)
Obrąb, Wyszków County in Masovian Voivodeship (east-central Poland)
Obrąb, West Pomeranian Voivodeship (north-west Poland)